The Women's Singles 10 table tennis competition at the 2004 Summer Paralympics was held from 18 to 21 September at the Galatsi Olympic Hall.

Classes 6–10 were for athletes with a physical impairment who competed from a standing position; the lower the number, the greater the impact the impairment had on an athlete’s ability to compete.

The event was won by Natalia Partyka, representing .

Results

Preliminaries

Group A

Group B

Competition bracket

References

W
Para